Grace Wood (born 19 August 1932) is a British former swimmer. She competed in the women's 400 metre freestyle at the 1952 Summer Olympics. She also represented England and won a bronze medal in the 440 Yard Freestyle Relay at the 1950 British Empire Games in Auckland, New Zealand.

References

1932 births
Living people
British female swimmers
Olympic swimmers of Great Britain
Swimmers at the 1952 Summer Olympics
Place of birth missing (living people)
Commonwealth Games medallists in swimming
Commonwealth Games bronze medallists for England
Swimmers at the 1950 British Empire Games
British female freestyle swimmers
20th-century British women
Medallists at the 1950 British Empire Games